Synodontis voltae  is a species of upside-down catfish endemic to Burkina Faso where it is found in the Bougouriba River.  This species grows to a length of  TL.

References

External links 

voltae
Freshwater fish of Africa
Freshwater fish of West Africa
Endemic fauna of Burkina Faso
Fish described in 1975